Pililaau Army Recreation Center (part of the Armed Forces Recreation Centers system) is located on the island of Oahu provides 39 beachfront cabins, one distinguished visitor cabin, an equipment rental center and a pavilion for active duty, reserve, national guard, retired military, and DoD civilian personnel to use. Located at Pokai Bay, PARC is 35 miles from Waikiki and 18 miles from Schofield Barracks, on the Leeward Coast. The gentle waves and sand beaches for families, snorkelers and scuba enthusiasts.  All cabins come furnished with linens, have air conditioning and ceiling fans, as well as, cable TV and telephone, a private sundeck and barbecue grill. The kitchens are equipped with cooking utensils, tableware, and dishes. 

The Herbert K. Pililaau ARC is named for Herbert Kalili Pililaau a United States Army soldier and a recipient of the United States military's highest decoration, the Medal of Honor, for his actions in the Korean War.

References

External links
 http://www.himwr.com/recreation-and-leisure/lodging/parc

Hotels in Hawaii
Armed Forces Recreation Centers
Installations of the United States Army in Hawaii